The 14th annual Berlin International Film Festival was held from 26 June to 7 July 1964. The Swedish film 491 by Vilgot Sjöman was rejected by festival director Alfred Bauer owing to its controversial nature. The Golden Bear was awarded to the Turkish film Susuz Yaz directed by Metin Erksan.

Jury
The following people were announced as being on the jury for the festival:

International feature film jury
 Anthony Mann, director (United States) - Jury President
 Hermann Schwerin, jurist and film producer  (West Germany)
 Lucas Demare, director, screenwriter and producer (Argentina)
 Jacques Doniol-Valcroze, actor, director, screenwriter and film critic (France)
 Yorgos Javellas, director and screenwriter (Greece)
 Richard Todd, actor (United Kingdom)
 Takashi Hamama (United Arab Emirates)
 Gerd Ressing, historian and journalist (West Germany)

International documentary and short jury
 Girija Kanta Mookerjee, diplomat, educator and writer (India) - Jury President
 Ferdinand Kastner, film critic (Austria)
 Burhan Arpad, journalist and writer (Turkey)
 Hans-Joachim Hossfeld, director (West Germany)
 Peter Schamoni, director, screenwriter and producer (West Germany)
 Aud Thagaard, film critic (Norway)
 Roland Verhavert, director (Belgium)

Films in competition
The following films were in competition for the Golden Bear award:

Key
{| class="wikitable" width="550" colspan="1"
| style="background:#FFDEAD;" align="center"| †
|Winner of the main award for best film in its section
|}

Awards
The following prizes were awarded by the Jury:

International jury awards
 Golden Bear: Susuz Yaz by Metin Erksan
 Silver Bear for Best Director: Satyajit Ray for মহানগর Mahānagar
 Silver Bear for Best Actress: Sachiko Hidari for にっぽん昆虫記 Nippon Konchūki and 彼女と彼 Kanojo to kare
 Silver Bear for Best Actor: Rod Steiger for The Pawnbroker
 Silver Bear Extraordinary Jury Prize: Ruy Guerra for Os Fuzis

Documentaries and short films jury awards
 Golden Bear (Documentaries): Alleman by Bert Haanstra
 Short Film Golden Bear: Kirdi by Max Lersch
 Silver Bear for Best Short Film: ex aequoSunday Lark by Sanford SemelKontraste by Wolfgang UrchsAnmeldung by Rob Houwer
 Silver Bear Extraordinary Jury Prize (Short film): Signale by Raimund Ruehl

Independent jury awards
FIPRESCI Award
La visita by Antonio Pietrangeli
Honorable Mention:
The Pawnbroker by Sidney Lumet
Interfilm Award
Selvmordsskolen by Knud Leif Thomsen
OCIC Award
彼女と彼 Kanojo to kare by Susumu Hani
UNICRIT Award
Alleman by Bert Haanstra
Youth Film Award (Jugendfilmpreis):
Best Feature Film Suitable for Young People: 彼女と彼 Kanojo to kare by Susumu Hani
Honorable Mention: Time of the Innocent by Thomas Fantl
Best Documentary Film Suitable for Young People: The Human Dutch by Bert Haanstra
Best Short Film Suitable for Young People: Anmeldung by Rob Houwer and ある機関助士 Aru kikan joshi by Noriaki Tsuchimoto

References

External links
 14th Berlin International Film Festival 1964
1964 Berlin International Film Festival
Berlin International Film Festival:1964  at Internet Movie Database

14
1964 film festivals
1964 in West Germany
1960s in West Berlin
June 1964 events in Europe
July 1964 events in Europe